The Hawk MD3R is a Le Mans Prototype mid-engine race car chassis raced between 1994 and 1995 and 1997 and 2001, on tracks such as Daytona International Speedway, Sebring, and Laguna Seca.  It is often complemented by Mazda engines, such as the 2.0 L 3-Rotor, however it has also been raced with a Chevrolet engine
The vehicle has been run most frequently by Support Net Racing Inc., Team South Carolina and Genesis Racing

References

Hawk MD3R
24 Hours of Le Mans race cars